There are over 20,000 Grade II* listed buildings in England. This is a list of these buildings in the former district of North Dorset in the county of Dorset.

North Dorset

|}

See also
Grade I listed buildings in Dorset

Notes

External links

Lists of Grade II* listed buildings in Dorset
 
North Dorset District